
Gmina Tuchów is an urban-rural gmina (administrative district) in Tarnów County, Lesser Poland Voivodeship, in southern Poland.

The gmina contains part of the protected area called Pasmo Brzanki Landscape Park.

Villages
Apart from the town of Tuchów, Gmina Tuchów contains the villages and settlements of Buchcice, Burzyn, Dąbrówka Tuchowska, Jodłówka Tuchowska, Karwodrza, Łowczów, Lubaszowa, Meszna Opacka, Piotrkowice, Siedliska, Trzemeszna and Zabłędza.

Neighbouring gminas
Gmina Tuchów is bordered by the gminas of Gromnik, Pleśna, Ryglice, Rzepiennik Strzyżewski, Skrzyszów, Szerzyny and Tarnów.

References
Polish official population figures 2006

Tuchow
Tarnów County